Mirabi Valiyev (born 13 September 1970) is a Ukrainian former wrestler who competed in the 1996 Summer Olympics and in the 2000 Summer Olympics.

References

1970 births
Living people
People from Leningor district
Olympic wrestlers of Ukraine
Wrestlers at the 1996 Summer Olympics
Wrestlers at the 2000 Summer Olympics
Ukrainian male sport wrestlers
Ukrainian people of Ossetian descent
Ossetian people